East Bristol is an unincorporated community in the town of Bristol, in Dane County, Wisconsin, United States.

History
It was first known as "Columbus Settlement."

Notes

Unincorporated communities in Wisconsin
Unincorporated communities in Dane County, Wisconsin
Madison, Wisconsin, metropolitan statistical area